Daniel Muñoz-de la Nava and Santiago Ventura were the defending champions, but Ventura decided not to participate.
Muñoz-de la Nava plays alongside Rubén Ramírez Hidalgo and they won the title, defeating Gerard Granollers and Adrián Menéndez 6–4, 6–7(4–7), [13–11] in the final.

Seeds

Draw

Draw

References
 Main Draw

2011
Doubles